Jane Richmond Hyslop (born 15 February 1967), known professionally as Jane Child, is a Canadian singer, songwriter and record-producer best known for her hit single "Don't Wanna Fall in Love". She is also known for her unusual fashion style, which included a hairstyle made of spikes and ankle-length braids and a nose chain piercing.

Early life
Child was born in Toronto, and is the daughter of noted Canadian classical musician Ricky Hyslop, while her mother was a singer and pianist. She has two brothers. Child was raised Christian, and was classically trained as a pianist during her youth. Her parents taught her how to play and sing by kindergarten. The first record she ever owned was the Beatles Rubber Soul, purchased by her father so that she could learn the arrangement of Michelle. Her exposure to funk music came from having Christmases in Fort Lauderdale, Florida, and listening to local music there on the beaches.

At age 12 she joined the Canadian Opera Company's children's chorus, and soon after studied piano briefly at the Royal Conservatory of Music under Samuel Dolin. At age 15 she dropped out of school despite good grades. While seeking a summer job she saw an ad in a newspaper for a band looking for a keyboardist, which she applied for and joined. It was a touring rock and roll band of Deadheads known as Summerhill that played remote northern Canadian towns, and paid her $25 a week. She played the synthesizer, piano, and organ, and sang in their shows for over 45 weeks in their first year together. She also had various other musical jobs, such as organist at the Anglican church in her neighbourhood and at horse-shows, playing piano for ballet classes and at piano bars, and recording jingles for commercials.

Career
Eventually Child cut a demo tape in Hamilton, Ontario with the engineer who owned the studio where she had been recording jingles. With a low budget, she would bus out to the studio and play all the instruments herself. Child was signed by a New York based production company after a partner in the company, who was a client of Child's entertainment lawyer, heard the tape. She subsequently relocated to New York and then Los Angeles. Adamant about producing her own music, Child left the label. After a bidding war with 13 other labels, she settled with Warner Bros. Records, who agreed to sign her on her own terms. At this time she was struggling to pay bills despite extravagant nights out for label meetings. One of her first potential breaks was when a publishing company sent a song she wrote to Maurice White, but in the end he chose not to record the song despite liking it. 

Her debut album, Jane Child, released in 1989, was fully written and produced by Child, who also performed all the vocals and played all the instruments (except for the guitar parts), a rarity for a debut artist signed to a major label. Due to her musical style and her emphasis on control over her music, she was at the time labelled by the press as "the female Prince".

She is best known for the hit single "Don't Wanna Fall in Love", which peaked at No. 2 on the Billboard Hot 100 in 1990. The song was also a big hit on the R&B chart - a rarity for a white artist - peaking at No. 6. Her previous single, "Welcome to the Real World", was a modest hit, peaking at No. 49 on the Billboard Hot 100.

In 1993, she released her second album, Here Not There. In the album, she broadened her R&B sound to mix it with traces of rock, grunge, and Eastern music. The album and its singles were commercial failures, and she was dropped from the label and kept a low profile for the rest of the decade, though releasing a few collaborations with Japanese artists in that country.

In 2001, she re-recorded the song "World Lullabye" from her debut album and sold the single through her website. All proceeds were donated to the Twin Towers Fund.

Her third album, Surge, was released in early 2002 on her own label, Sugarwave. 

She recorded a cover of Tina Turner's "We Don't Need Another Hero" for the tribute album, What's Love? A Tribute to Tina Turner, released in 2004.

In the Just Dance video game franchise, she contributed vocals to cover songs for Just Dance 2016 and Just Dance 2017.

Artistry
Child's look was inspired by African and East Indian cultures, as well as the punk movement, which came from living amongst these diasporas in Toronto. Her notable hair style, which she started at the age of 17, would be redone once a month by 3 women taking 14 hours to do. Her musical influences included Stevie Wonder, the Sex Pistols, Led Zeppelin, Jimi Hendrix, Janis Joplin, Public Enemy, Mozart, Indian music, Alicia de Larrocha, and Glenn Gould.

Child would do her own cataloguing for programming, including the samples and sequences, often for 14 hours at a time. She writes left handed and would sing as she wrote, also coming up with the bass line with her left hand. In studio some of the gear she used included Fairlight, Sequential Prophet 5 and T-8, LinnDrum, E-mu SP12, Synclavier, Roland MSQ-700 and the Roland SBX-80. For tours her gear included a Minimoog, a Solina (ARP String Ensemble), a Mini-Korg, a Hammond B3 with a Leslie 145, and a Yamaha CP-70 electric grand.

Personal life
Child has been married to Cat Gray, the chief musician on Let's Make a Deal, since 2004.

In 1990 she purchased the 1917 Los Angeles house of Vidah Bickford, a locally based guitarist and mandolinist. She enjoys collecting Citroens and antiques.

Awards and Nominations
{| class="wikitable sortable plainrowheaders" 
|-
! scope="col" | Award
! scope="col" | Year
! scope="col" | Nominee(s)
! scope="col" | Category
! scope="col" | Result
! scope="col" class="unsortable"| 
|-
! scope="row" rowspan=4|Juno Awards
| rowspan=4|1991
| rowspan=3|Herself
| Most Promising Female Vocalist
| 
| rowspan=4|
|-
| Songwriter of the Year
| 
|-
| Producer of the Year
| 
|-
| rowspan=2|"Don't Wanna Fall in Love"
| Dance Recording of the Year
| 
|-
! scope="row"|MTV Video Music Awards
| 1990
| Best New Artist in a Video
| 
|

Discography

Albums

Studio albums

Remix albums

Singles

As lead artist

As featured artist

References

External links

1967 births
Canadian dance musicians
Child, Jane
Canadian women rock singers
Canadian record producers
Canadian contemporary R&B singers
Jewish Canadian musicians
Juno Award for Dance Recording of the Year winners
Living people
Musicians from Toronto
21st-century Canadian women singers
20th-century Canadian women singers
Freestyle musicians
Canadian women singer-songwriters
Canadian women record producers
Canadian women in electronic music
Canadian expatriates in the United States